William Emery Edjenguélé (born 7 May 1987) is an English footballer who plays for  side Bedworth United, where he plays as a centre-back.

Career
Born in Paris, Edjenguélé began his career 1993 with CFF Paris and joined 2005 in the reserve team of Le Mans Union Club 72. After three years with Le Mans UC 72 B who scored one goal in 58 appearances joined on 18 July 2008 to Neuchâtel Xamax. On 27 April 2010 his club confirmed his contract will not renewed and he left the club.

On 30 July 2010, he signed with Panetolikos F.C. He was an integral part of the squad that became 2010–11 Football League champions and led Panetolikos F.C. to the Greek Superleague. However, he could not help Panetolikos avoid relegation after the end of the 2011–12 Superleague Greece . Panetolikos and Edjenguélé parted ways on 2 May 2012.

At the start of the 2012–13 season, Edjenguélé joined Coventry City on trial and started in the 8–0 victory over Hinckley United on 14 July 2012. He later signed for the club on 17 July on a three-year contract. Edjenguélé scored his first goal, with a header, in a 3–1 win over Colchester United.

On 20 August 2013, Edjenguélé had his contract at Coventry City terminated by mutual consent. He had made a big impression in his one season with the club, playing 40 games after joining on a free transfer from Greek side Panetolikos. But he was one of several players made available for transfer in the summer as they battled financial problems. On the same day it was reported that he had signed for Bury.

On 29 January 2014, Edjenguélé cancelled his contract at Bury on mutual terms. He made 23 appearances for Football League Two side Bury after joining on a free transfer from the Sky Blues. William Edjenguele then re-signed for his former club Panetolikos in Greece Super League. The 26-year-old returned on a one-year contract to the Greek team where he previously played for two seasons before he moved to the Ricoh Arena in 2012. This was a successful season finishing one place off the playoffs which is the highest position in the club's history.

In June 2015, after a successful season, Edjenguélé earned a two-year contract with the Greek Super League club Veria.

He signed a one-year contract with Scottish Championship club Dundee United in August 2016. During his third season with United, Edjenguélé moved on loan to Falkirk in January 2019.

In November 2019 Edjenguélé joined Wealdstone of the National League South division in England. In June 2020 he left Wealdstone to join Southern League club Nuneaton Borough.

Edjenguélé signed for Southern League Premier Central rivals Barwell on 24 September 2021. Edjenguélé made his debut the following day in an away Southern League Premier Central fixture against Rushall Olympic, he played the full match in a 2-0 defeat.

On 7 June 2022, William signed for Northern Premier League Division One Midlands side Bedworth United.

Personal life
Edjenguélé is married to the daughter of former Coventry City goalkeeper Steve Ogrizovic. He is a user of Twitter, so he can be closer to the fans by running regular competitions for his worn match-shirts and sharing his thoughts on his performances.

Career statistics

Honours
Panetolikos
 Greek Second Division: 2010-11

Dundee United
 Scottish Challenge Cup: 2016-17

References

1987 births
Living people
Footballers from Paris
Association football defenders
French footballers
Neuchâtel Xamax FCS players
Le Mans FC players
Panetolikos F.C. players
Veria F.C. players
Coventry City F.C. players
Dundee United F.C. players
Falkirk F.C. players
Wealdstone F.C. players
Nuneaton Borough F.C. players
Barwell F.C. players
Bedworth United F.C. players
Expatriate footballers in Greece
French sportspeople of Cameroonian descent
English Football League players
Expatriate footballers in England
Expatriate footballers in Scotland
French expatriate footballers
Scottish Professional Football League players
National League (English football) players